The Institute for Information Industry (III; , abbreviated ) was established in 1979 as a Non-Governmental Organization (NGO) to support the  communication sector in Taiwan under the supervision of the Republic of China Ministry of Economic Affairs. It has international partnerships with InBIA, IEEE and Cisco Networking Academy.

Organization 
III is supervised by a Board of Directors and led by the President/CEO.  The organization is composed of 3 functional groups: R&D Institutes, Service Units and Operational Supports.

Core Competences

Research and Development 
Network and Multimedia
ITeS
Digital Education
Green ICT

Industry Services 
Industry Think Tank
Science and Technology Law
Industry Incubation

Intellectual Property 
Technology Transfer
Patents

Locations

Headquarters 
III’s headquarters occupies the 8th to 11th floors of the Science and Technology Building.

Branch Offices 
5F, 7F, 8F, 14F, No. 133, Sec. 4 Minsheng East Road, Taipei City 105, Taiwan, R.O.C.
8F, No.151, Sec. 3, Xinyi Road, Taipei City 106, Taiwan, R.O.C.
19F, 22F, No. 216, Sec. 2, Dunhua South Road, Taipei 106, Taiwan, R.O.C.
3F-3, No. 2, Fuxing 4th Road, Kaohsiung City, 80661 Taiwan, R.O.C. (Kaohsiung Software Technology Park)
No.2, Wenxian Rd., Nantou City, Nantou County 540, Taiwan (R.O.C.)

Leadership 
Chairman
 2009–2012:Chintay Shih
 2012–2016:Jin-Fu Chang
 2016.5-2016.8:Ta-Sheng Lo (Acting chairman)
 2016.8-2017.9:Yau-Hwang Kuo
 2017.10-present:Dr. Chih-Kung Lee
President
 2010–2012:Chih-Kung Lee
 2012–2016:Ruey-Beei Wu
 2016.5-2016.8 :Jonq-Min Liu (Acting president)
 2016.8-2017.10:Jonq-Min Liu
 2017.11-2018.10:Hsiao-Pin Yu (Yuster)
 2018.10-2019.1:Po Jen Hsiao (Acting president)
 2019.1-present:CH Cho

References

External links 

 

1979 establishments in Taiwan
Organizations established in 1979
Research institutes in Taiwan
Non-profit organizations based in Taiwan
Multidisciplinary research institutes
Gambling companies